Causes, or causality, is the relationship between one event and another. It may also refer to:

 Causes (band), an indie band based in the Netherlands
 Causes (company), an online company

See also 

 Cause (disambiguation)